Iliya Yurukov (born 22 September 1999) is a Bulgarian footballer who currently plays as a midfielder for Arda Kardzhali.

Career
On 7 May 2017, Yurukov made his senior debut for Levski, replacing Tunde Adeniji in the 83rd minute as Levski won 1-0 at away against Cherno more in the First League. In June 2021, Yurukov joined Arda Kardzhali.

Career statistics

Club

References

External links
 
 Profile at LevskiSofia.info

1999 births
Living people
Bulgarian footballers
Bulgaria youth international footballers
First Professional Football League (Bulgaria) players
PFC Levski Sofia players
FC Arda Kardzhali players
Association football midfielders
Footballers from Plovdiv